The single sculls was one of the competitions in the Rowing at the 1900 Summer Olympics events in Paris. It was held on 25 and 26 August 1900. 12 athletes from 3 nations competed. Four quarterfinals, two semifinals, and a final were held. The event was won by Hermann Barrelet of France; the host nation also took silver with André Gaudin. Saint-George Ashe of Great Britain earned bronze, after interfering with another rower in the quarterfinals and advancing out of the semifinals for unknown reasons after placing third in his heat.

Background

This was the first appearance of the event. Rowing had been on the programme in 1896 but was cancelled due to bad weather. The single sculls has been held every time that rowing has been contested, beginning in 1900.

Great Britain's best sculler, C. V. Fox, entered but withdrew.

Competition format

The tournament featured three rounds: quarterfinals, semifinals, and a final. There were four quarterfinals, each with three boats; the top two in each advanced to the semifinals. The two semifinals each had four boats, with the top two advancing to the final. The final was a four-boat race.

The distance for each race was 1750 metres, rather than the 2000 metres which was becoming standard even at the time (and has been used in the Olympics since 1912, except in 1948).

Schedule

Results

Quarterfinals

The top two rowers in each heat advanced to the semifinals.

Quarterfinal 1

Ashe went out of his rowing lane, interfering with Benoit. Despite this, he was not disqualified.

Quarterfinal 2

Quarterfinal 3

Quarterfinal 4

Semifinals

The top two rowers in each semifinal advanced to the final.

Semifinal 1

For unknown reasons, Ashe protested the result of this semifinal. Barrelet and Gaudin objected and refused to race if Ashe were advanced, but eventually relented. The final therefore included five rowers instead of the planned four.

Semifinal 2

Final

Yet another protest marred the single sculls competition in the final, as Prével complained of being interfered with after falling in the water and dropping out of the race; his protest was rejected. Barrelet and Gaudin, who had placed first and second in both the preliminary round and the semifinal, did so once again in the final. Ashe took the bronze medal, with d'Heilly close behind him.

Results summary

References

External links
 International Olympic Committee medal winners database
 De Wael, Herman. Herman's Full Olympians: "Rowing 1900". Accessed 26 February 2006.
 

Rowing at the 1900 Summer Olympics